The FINA Water Polo World Rankings is a ranking system for men's and women's national teams in water polo. The teams of the member nations of FINA, water polo's world governing body, are ranked based on their competitions results with the most successful teams being ranked highest.

Calculation method

Tournaments
The following competitions are currently FINA-recognised tournaments.

Men's water polo tournaments:
 Major international competitions
 Summer Olympics (quadrennially)
 Olympic Qualification Tournament (quadrennially)
 World Aquatics Championships (biennially)
 FINA Water Polo World Cup (quadrennially)
 FINA Water Polo World League (annually)
 Other international competitions
 FINA Water Polo Challengers' Cup (biennially)
 Major continental competitions
 Asian Games (quadrennially)
 European Water Polo Championship (biennially)
 Pan American Games (quadrennially)
 Other continental competitions
 Asian Swimming Championships (quadrennially)
 Asian Water Polo Championship (quadrennially)
 UANA Water Polo Cup

Women's water polo tournaments:
 Major international competitions
 Summer Olympics (quadrennially)
 Olympic Qualification Tournament (quadrennially)
 World Aquatics Championships (biennially)
 FINA Water Polo World Cup (quadrennially)
 FINA Water Polo World League (annually)
 Major continental competitions
 Asian Games (quadrennially)
 European Water Polo Championship (biennially)
 Pan American Games (quadrennially)
 Other continental competitions
 Asian Swimming Championships (quadrennially)
 Asian Water Polo Championship (quadrennially)
 UANA Water Polo Cup

Points
Points are assigned according to a team's final placement in the FINA-recognised tournaments.

Formula

2016–present
All points of the FINA-recognised tournaments for last Olympiad are included in ranking points calculation.

Example 1:

Example 2:

2008–2016
All points of the FINA-recognised tournaments that begin at the opening of the Olympic Summer Games and end at the opening of the next Olympics are included in ranking points calculation.

Example 3:

Example 4:

Men's rankings

Abbreviations

Current ranking
As of 9 August 2021 (updated after the 2020 Summer Olympics).

Former rankings

1 Jan 2016 – 31 Dec 2019

29 Jul 2012 – 5 Aug 2016

8 Aug 2008 – 28 Jul 2012

By year (2008–2021)

Total points
As of 9 August 2021 (updated after the 2020 Summer Olympics).

Women's rankings

Abbreviations

Current ranking
As of 9 August 2021 (updated after the 2020 Summer Olympics).

Former rankings

1 Jan 2016 – 31 Dec 2019

30 Jul 2012 – 8 Aug 2016

8 Aug 2008 – 29 Jul 2012

By year (2008–2021)

Total points
As of 9 August 2021 (updated after the 2020 Summer Olympics).

See also
 List of water polo world medalists
 Major achievements in water polo by nation

Notes

References

External links
 Water polo | fina.org – Official FINA website

Water polo